John McAlister, KC (July 27, 1842 – November 4, 1918) was a lawyer and political figure in New Brunswick, Canada. He represented Restigouche in the House of Commons of Canada from 1891 to 1900 as a Liberal-Conservative member.

He was born in Durham Centre, New Brunswick, of Scottish descent, and was educated there and at Miramichi. He was called to the bar in 1879. He was the first mayor of Campbellton, serving from 1888 to 1889. In 1894, McAlister was named Queen's Counsel. He died in Campbellton at the age of 76.

John McAlister was also the First President of the Caledonian Society of Restigouche. 1898

References 

1842 births
1918 deaths
Members of the House of Commons of Canada from New Brunswick
Conservative Party of Canada (1867–1942) MPs
Mayors of Campbellton, New Brunswick
Canadian King's Counsel